Kingsmead School was a co-educational private day school for boys and girls aged 2 to 16 and, from 2018 until its closure, offered a sixth form for students up to age 18. The school is located in Hoylake, on the Wirral Peninsula. The school was founded in 1904 by Arthur Watts, a Baptist minister and mathematician. In 1911 the school motto was selected, "Dominus Vitae Robur" – The Lord is the Strength of my Life.  Kingsmead is a member of the Independent Association of Preparatory Schools (IAPS). It was closed in 2020.

History
In 1904, Arthur Watts, a gifted mathematician and one of six sons of a Baptist minister, founded Kingsmead School. His dream was to establish a Christian school in which ‘the environment would be ideal for learning well, for playing good games and keeping physically fit’. All but one of his brothers became involved in the school's early years; three of them were scholars of the University of Cambridge.

World War I claimed the lives of thirteen Old Kingsmeadians and each one was a personal bereavement to Arthur Watts. Two Kingsmeadians won the Military Cross – a master, Lieutenant Lavery, and Francis Wright Atherton who was just 19 years old.

The years between the wars were ones of economy and survival as the Great Depression took the world in its grip. It would take until 1944 for numbers to return to their 1921 levels. By 1939 Kingsmead was 35 years old and Arthur Watts, aged 68, had just two years in which he shared the running of the school with his son before Gordon was called up to the RAF. At 70, Arthur was left to steer Kingsmead alone through another war.

After the Second World War, another son, David, returned to Kingsmead in 1949 to run the school in partnership with his brother Gordon. He soon became the sole head and during his 30-year leadership the school continued to expand, becoming co-educational in the mid-1960s. New facilities followed each other rapidly: a heated indoor pool, woodland plantation, the Memorial Hall and new science labs. In 1966 an Educational Trust was set up to secure the school for the future.

The 1990s saw more expansion, firstly to include children from the age of two in a new kindergarten. This was followed shortly afterwards by the extension of the leaving age; the school now educates children up to the age of 16, offering a wide range of GCSE subjects.

Although it expanded over the years, the school still occupies the original site. The long-awaited Music Block opened in 1984 and the Centenary Building, which was the flagship of the Senior Department, was opened in 2004, rapidly becoming the centre-piece of the newly extended 11–16 senior campus.

In 2012 the boarding department was closed and reopened in 2017 shortly followed by the establishment of a new Sixth Form in September 2018.

It was announced in June 2020 that the school would close permanently at the end of the school year. A letter to parents from the school explaining the closure stated that low pupil numbers exacerbated by the COVID-19 crisis meant that the school could no longer afford to remain open.

Ethos and assessment
Although Kingsmead was a Christian School, it welcomed children of all beliefs and none. The school day started with an assembly which included a Bible reading, an address, a hymn and prayers.

In Feb 2011 Ofsted reported the some areas of boarding provision to be inadequate – notice of action to improve being given. In 2013 the Independent Schools Inspectorate (ISI) found the school was successful but with further action required to meet regulations. In March 2016 The ISI Compliance Inspection found that the Kingsmead met all regulations and there were no recommendations for improvement. The report said "The proprietor ensures that the leadership and management demonstrate good skills and knowledge, and fulfill their responsibilities effectively, so that the standards are consistently met and they actively promote the well-being of the pupils."<http://www.isi.net/schools/6613>

Notable former pupils
Former pupils of the school are known as Old Kingsmeadians (OKs). Notable Old Kingsmeadians include the following.
Nicola Horlick, investment fund manager
Julian Lennon, musician, songwriter, actor and photographer; son of John Lennon
Philip Mould OBE, art dealer and art historian

Headteachers
1904–1945 Arthur Watts
1939–1941, 1945–1953 Gordon Watts
1949–1962, 1963–1979 David Watts
1962–1963 John Mayor
1962–1963 Stanley Payne
1979–1986 Nicholas Bawtree
1986–1992 John Eadie
1992–2006 Edward Hugh Bradby
2006–2010 Jonathan Perry
2010–2020 Mark Gibbons

See also
 List of schools in Merseyside
 List of independent schools in the United Kingdom

References

External links
Kingsmead School website
OFSTED Reports on Kingsmead School

Defunct schools in the Metropolitan Borough of Wirral
Educational institutions established in 1904
1904 establishments in England
Educational institutions disestablished in 2020
2020 disestablishments in England